Omarabad or Amrabad or Omarabad or Umrabad may refer to:
 Amrabad, Kazerun (امراباد), Fars Province
 Amrabad, Khamareh (عمراباد), Fars Province
 Omrabad, Hamadan (عمراباد)
 Amrabad Kurd, Hamadan Province
 Amrabad, Kerman (عمراباد)
 Amrabad, Kermanshah (عمراباد)
 Omarabad, Markazi (عمراباد)
 Omarabad, Sistan and Baluchestan (عمراباد)
 Omarabad, West Azerbaijan (عمراباد)
 Omarabad, Anzal (عمراباد), West Azerbaijan Province